Oka Chinna Family Story is an Indian Telugu-language comedy-drama web series  created by Manasa Sharma and Mahesh Uppala and produced by Niharika Konidela. The series is directed by Mahesh Uppala and has an ensemble cast of Sangeeth Shobhan, Tulasi and Simran Sharma. It premiered on 19 November 2021 on ZEE5.

Synopsis 

Mahesh’s small middle-class family is in for a cruel twist when the father bequeaths a huge debt of Rs 25 lakhs. A serious plot with hilarious commentary follows as the family attempts to negotiate through the difficulties.

Cast 

 Sangeeth Shobhan as Mahesh
 Tulasi as Rukmini, Mahesh's mother
 Simran Sharma as Keerthi
 Prameela Rani as grandmother of Mahesh
 Naresh as Haridas, Mahesh's father
 Rajeev Kanakala as Mahesh's maternal uncle
 Roopa Laxmi as Keerthi's mother
 Getup Srinu as Agent Balu

Episodes

Soundtrack

Reception 
The series was well received and garnered over 60 million views in the first 10 days. ZEE 5 declared it a super hit. Thadhagath Pathi of The Times of India gave a rating of 3.5 out of 5 and praised the performances of lead actors, screenplay and direction. He further stated that "Oka Chinna Family Story truly has the makings of a new-age comedy that doesn’t resort to cringy dialogues for the sake of laughs. Don’t miss it if you love light-hearted dramas". Eenadu mentioned that background score, Tulasi's acting and story are the positives and slow-paced narration is the negative of the series.

References

External links 

 

Telugu-language web series
2021 web series debuts
ZEE5 original programming
Indian comedy web series
Indian drama web series
Comedy-drama web series